James D. Mason (born January 7, 1951) is an American professional golfer.

Mason was born in Duluth, Georgia. He graduated in 1973 from Auburn University in Auburn, Alabama, with a degree in Business Administration. He turned professional in 1973.

Mason joined the Senior PGA Tour (now Champions Tour) in 2001 and has won once, the 2002 NFL Golf Classic.

Professional wins (5)

Other wins (4)
1997 Georgia PGA Championship
1999 Georgia PGA Championship
2000 Georgia PGA Championship
2015 Georgia PGA Championship

Champions Tour wins (1)

Champions Tour playoff record (0–1)

References

External links

American male golfers
Auburn Tigers men's golfers
PGA Tour Champions golfers
Golfers from Georgia (U.S. state)
People from Duluth, Georgia
People from Rabun County, Georgia
Sportspeople from the Atlanta metropolitan area
1951 births
Living people